The Crown Princess, is a Thai television series, premiered on May 14, 2018  and last aired on June 19, 2018 on Channel 3. It starred Urassaya Sperbund and Nadech Kugimiya and produced by Ann Thongprasom.

Synopsis
Because her life was put into danger after her coronation, Crown Princess Alice (Urassaya Sperbund) of the country Hyross was secretly sent to Thailand, where Dawin Samuthyakorn (Nadech Kugimiya), a Lieutenant Commander of the Thai Navy and Navy SEAL, becomes her bodyguard.

Cast

Main 
 Urassaya Sperbund as Princess Alice Madeline Tereza Fillippe (aka Naree Singjun-Samuthyakorn)
 Nadech Kugimiya as Lieutenant Commander Dawin Samuthyakorn 
 Sara Legge as Princess Catherine "Kate" William Ann Fillippe
 Intad Leowrakwong as Prince Alan Aaron Mark Andre Fillipe

Supporting 
 Khunnarong Prathetrat as Pilot Ratchata "Hin" Janenapa 
 Rawiwan Bunprachom as Sergeant Danika "Paen" Samuthyakorn
 Nirut Sirijanya as King Henry Antoine Phillipe of Hrysos
 Nithichai "Yuan" Yotamornsunthorn as Lieutenant Pakorn "Kan" Chanchit 
 Natthapong Chartpong as Second Lieutenant Lopboon "Ling" Jitdeva 
 Jakkrit Ammarat as General Sakchaiara Legge 
 Parisaya Jaronetisat as JC, Alice's bodyguard
 Teerapong Leowrakwong as Prince Andre Fillippe
 Cindy Bishop as Princess Mona 
 Yanin Vismitananda as Petra, Alice's bodyguard
 Matthew Deane as Prince William "Wil" 
 Peter Corp Dyrendal as Haedeth 
 Areeya Chumsai as Maj.Gen. Sawanee Samuthyakorn, Mother of Dawin 
 Sakuntala Thianphairot as Priew, wife of Lopboon
 Jaidee Deedeedee as Sakchaiara's wife

Others 
 Byron Bishop as Decha Samuthyakorn, Father of Dawin 
 Kanut Rojanai as Dom 
 Sasha Christensen as Princess Alice 
 Sriphan Chunechomboon as Sawanee's bodyguard
 Pitchapa Phanthumchinda as Mutmee 
 Kathaleeya McIntosh as Princess Natalie (Princess Alice' Mom)
 Anne Thongprasom as Princess Anna (Princess Kate's Mother)
 Passorn Boonyakiart
 Myria Benedetti
 Ryan Jett
 Jason Young

Original Soundtrack
 The opening song is  Nah Tee Gub Hua Jai  (in English "Duty and Heart") sung by Nadech Kugimiya and Mutmee Pimdao.
 The second song in the series is  Distance  (ระยะห่าง) by Max Jenmana.
 The third song in the series is Ruk Nai Jai (รัก ใน ใจ) by Suparuj Techatanon.

Ratings
In the table below, the blue numbers represent the lowest ratings and the red numbers represent the highest ratings.

Awards and nominations

International broadcast 
 The series was aired in the Philippines by GMA Network from April 8 to May 23, 2019 and rerun from January 20 to March 31, 2020.
 The series was aired in Vietnam by HTV2, entitled Yêu anh là điều không thể (original Vietnamese sub title Duyên trời định / Sứ mệnh và con tim) from September 21, 2019.

References

External links 

 Ch3 Thailand Official Website
 Ch3 Thailand (Youtube) Official Website

2010s Thai television series
2018 Thai television series debuts
2018 Thai television series endings
Thai action television series
Thai romance television series
Thai television soap operas
Channel 3 (Thailand) original programming